Ádám Pintér (born 12 June 1988) is a Hungarian professional football coach and a former midfielder. He is the assistant coach with MTK Budapest.

Club career

MTK Budapest
His first team was MTK Budapest where he played for four seasons, from the age of 18.

Real Zaragoza
Spanish club, Real Zaragoza has signed him in 2010 for four seasons. In his first season with Zaragoza he played 9 matches. On 9 August 2013, Zaragoza and Pintér agreed to cancel his contract, and he became a free agent.

Tom Tomsk
On 2 September 2013, the last day of the transfer window, it was announced that Pintér had joined Tom Tomsk, signing a one-year contract. Pintér made his debut against Anzhi Makhachkala.

Levadiakos
On 5 August 2014, Pintér signed a two-year contract with Levadiakos playing in Greek Super League. On 31 July 2015, he terminated his contract with Levadiakos.

Ferencváros
On 19 August 2015, Pintér was signed by Hungarian first division club Ferencvárosi TC.

International career
Pintér was selected for Hungary's Euro 2016 squad.

On 14 June 2016, Pintér played in the first group match in a 2–0 victory over Austria at the UEFA Euro 2016 Group F match at Nouveau Stade de Bordeaux, Bordeaux, France. He also played in the last group match in a 3–3 draw against Portugal at the Parc Olympique Lyonnais, Lyon on 22 June 2016.

Career statistics

Club

International

References

External links
 
 
 
 

1988 births
Living people
People from Balassagyarmat
Association football midfielders
Hungarian footballers
Hungary international footballers
UEFA Euro 2016 players
Nemzeti Bajnokság I players
Nemzeti Bajnokság II players
La Liga players
Russian Premier League players
Super League Greece players
2. Bundesliga players
MTK Budapest FC players
Balassagyarmati SE footballers
Real Zaragoza players
FC Tom Tomsk players
Levadiakos F.C. players
Ferencvárosi TC footballers
SpVgg Greuther Fürth players
Hungarian expatriate footballers
Hungarian expatriate sportspeople in Spain
Expatriate footballers in Spain
Hungarian expatriate sportspeople in Russia
Expatriate footballers in Russia
Hungarian expatriate sportspeople in Greece
Expatriate footballers in Greece
Hungarian expatriate sportspeople in Germany
Expatriate footballers in Germany
Hungarian football managers
Sportspeople from Nógrád County